
Gmina Kłecko is an urban-rural gmina (administrative district) in Gniezno County, Greater Poland Voivodeship, in west-central Poland.

Massacre during Second World War

During the German Invasion of Poland in 1939, German soldiers mass murdered 23 Poles in the area. The victims were either shot, beaten to death with rifles or stabbed to death by bayonets by German soldiers. They were later buried in a mass grave.

Villages
Apart from the town of Kłecko, Gmina Kłecko contains the villages and settlements of Bielawy, Biskupice, Bojanice, Brzozogaj, Charbowo, Czechy, Dębnica, Działyń, Dziećmiarki, Gorzuchowo, Kamieniec, Komorowo, Kopydłowo, Michalcza, Polska Wieś, Pomarzany, Pruchnowo, Sulin, Świniary, Ułanowo, Waliszewo, Wilkowyja and Zakrzewo.

Neighbouring gminas
Gmina Kłecko is bordered by the gminas of Gniezno, Kiszkowo, Łubowo, Mieleszyn, Mieścisko and Skoki.

References

Klecko
Gniezno County
Massacres in Poland
Germany–Poland relations
World War II crimes in Poland